An enhanced driver's licence or enhanced ID in common usage, is a card which functions both as driving licence and ID card with limited passport features issued in some provinces in Canada, in some states in the United States, for people who are both citizens of the country and residents of the relevant region, compliant with the Western Hemisphere Travel Initiative.

An EDL is a combined driver's license and passport card, meaning it allows for international land and sea travel, but not air travel, to countries that recognize it. The card includes machine-readable RFID and barcode for automated identification of the card and its holder.

As a Western Hemisphere Travel Initiative-compliant travel document, an EDL may be used for "official purposes" (such as boarding a domestic flight) covered by the U.S. REAL ID Act. However, a U.S. state that issues only EDLs, but does not issue any other REAL ID-compliant driver's license, is not deemed compliant with the REAL ID Act unless granted an extension. Likewise, REAL ID-compliant licenses alone are not sufficient to cross international borders, even if a state gives its REAL ID-compliant licenses a similar name.
 
EDLs are available to U.S. citizens who reside in the states of Michigan, Minnesota, New York, Vermont, and Washington.

As of August 2022, no Canadian provinces are issuing new EDLs and the program will terminate in the country once the validity of all existing EDLs lapse. Previously, EDLs were available to Canadian citizens residing in British Columbia, Manitoba,,Ontario and Quebec. Between 2008 and 2009, the Saskatchewan government spent approximately $600,000 to develop EDLs for the province. However after nearly a year into development, the Bill to codify EDLs into provincial law was voted down after an investigation by the Province's Privacy Commissioner and none were ever issued. After running it for five years, Quebec discontinued the EDL program in 2014, citing low demand as the reason. No EDLs have been issued in the province since 30 September 2014 and all licenses have expired by 2019. Ontario terminated the program in June 2019 as a government initiative to save costs, although existing EDRs remain valid until their expiration dates. British Columbia announced in early 2021 that the province will be phasing out EDLs and no new applications would be accepted as of January 18, 2021, for similar reasons. In February 2021, Manitoba, the last province that was still accepting new applications, announced that it would be discontinuing the enhanced driver's licences and enhanced identification cards in 2022. The province terminated the program in June 2022 and no new cards would be produced.

See also
 Driver's licenses in the United States
 FAST Card
 Global Entry
 NEXUS
 Real ID Act
 SENTRI

References

Driving licences
International travel documents